William Tipton may refer to:
 William H. Tipton, American photographer
 William Dolley Tipton, American World War I flying ace

See also
 Billy Tipton, American jazz musician, bandleader, and talent broker